Rio Haryanto (born 22 January 1993) is an Indonesian businessman and racing driver, He last competed in the 2019-20 Asian Le Mans Series and the Blancpain GT World Challenge Asia for T2 Motorsports. He participated in Formula One for Manor Racing during the 2016 season. As of 2022, he is the only Indonesian driver to have competed in Formula One.

Early career

Asian series

He began his car racing career competing in three Asian-based series during 2008: the Asian Formula Renault Challenge, Formula Asia 2.0, and Formula BMW Pacific. He was most competitive in the FAsia 2.0 series, winning two races to finish third overall in the championship behind expatriate European drivers Felix Rosenqvist and Matthias Beche.

In 2009 he again competed in a variety of series, including the Australian Drivers' Championship and the Asian Formula Renault Challenge once more. His main focus this year, however, was the Formula BMW Pacific championship, which he dominated with 11 victories from the 15 races (although five of these races were won outright by invitational drivers who were not entered in the championship), driving for the Malaysian Meritus team. This included a perfect run of four outright victories, pole positions and fastest laps in the four consecutive races held at his home circuit of Sentul. He also competed in a round of the equivalent European FBMW series, himself a guest driver on this occasion.

GP3 Series
Haryanto stepped up to the more competitive European racing scene full-time for 2010 by joining the Manor Racing team for the Formula One-supporting GP3 Series. His three teammates during the season were James Jakes, Adrien Tambay and Adrian Quaife-Hobbs. In an impressive first season at this level, he won a race at Istanbul Park and took two further podium placings to finish fifth place in the drivers' championship, the leading Manor driver. His form was "one of the surprises of the season", according to the Autosport magazine. He remained with the team for 2011, now badged as Marussia Manor Racing, alongside Quaife-Hobbs and Matias Laine. Despite increasing his victory count to two, with wins at the Nürburgring and the Hungaroring, his inconsistency—including a run of seven races without scoring points at the start of the year—saw him slip to seventh place in the championship, behind Quaife-Hobbs. Both of his victories were in rainy conditions, giving him something of a reputation as a wet-weather specialist.

Auto GP
In addition to his GP3 duties, Haryanto also drove for the DAMS team in the Auto GP series, competing in all but one round of the championship as it clashed with the GP3 schedule. Driving alongside Sergey Afanasyev and part-timer Tambay, he took a win at the Circuit Ricardo Tormo in Valencia and finished seventh in the drivers' standings. The efforts of Haryanto, Afanasyev, Tambay, and Haryanto's substitute, Kevin Korjus, were enough for DAMS to win the teams' championship.

GP2 Series

Haryanto made his GP2 Series début with DAMS at the non-championship season finale at Yas Marina in 2011. He was in the series full-time for 2012 with the Marussia-backed Carlin team, where he partnered Max Chilton. He was the first Indonesian to compete at this level of motorsport since Ananda Mikola competed in International Formula 3000 during 2000 and 2001. In his first season of GP2, Haryanto secured a single fastest lap, a single pole position—in wet conditions at Spa, confirming his reputation as a wet-weather specialist—and a best race finish of fifth in the feature race at Valencia, securing 14th place in the championship at season's end.

He raced in the 2013 GP2 Series for the Barwa Addax Team alongside teammate Jake Rosenzweig. On 30 June 2013, he gained his first podium in the GP2 Series at Silverstone and the same time, first podium for the Barwa Addax Team in the 2013 GP2 season.

For the 2014 GP2 Series he moved to EQ8 Caterham Racing, partnering with Alexander Rossi. On 24 May 2014, he gained his second podium in the GP2 Series at Monaco and, at the same time, first podium in the 2014 GP2 season.

Haryanto switched to Campos for the 2015 GP2 Series season. After taking second place at the feature race in Bahrain, Haryanto took his first win in GP2 in the following day's sprint race. He achieved his second victory in the sprint race at the Red Bull Ring despite a damaged front wing. Haryanto finished the 2015 GP2 Series season in fourth place with 138 points.

Formula One career

Haryanto had been linked to the Virgin Racing/Marussia F1/Manor Racing team since his first GP3 season with Manor in 2010, as he had driven for junior teams with its backing since then. In the autumn of that year, he won the right to test with Virgin at the end of the 2010 season due to his finishing position as the highest ranked Manor driver in the GP3 final standings. He tested for Virgin in Abu Dhabi on 16 November. Suffering gearbox problems, he posted the slowest time of the thirteen runners in the morning session. He did not receive the prize test in 2011 because teammate Adrian Quaife-Hobbs beat him in the standings on this occasion.

Haryanto and 2012 GP2 Series teammate Max Chilton drove for Marussia in the first young driver tests of 2012, held in-season at Silverstone. Running over the course of two days, Haryanto completed three hundred kilometres of testing, satisfying one of the conditions to be eligible for a superlicence and becoming the first Indonesian driver to qualify for one.

Manor (2016)
On 18 February 2016, Haryanto was confirmed as a driver of Manor Racing for the 2016 Formula One season alongside 2015 DTM Champion Pascal Wehrlein. He made his debut at the 2016 Australian Grand Prix, however got off to a rocky start with an incident involving Romain Grosjean when they collided in the pit lane during practice. Haryanto was later issued a three-place grid penalty for the incident, as well as two penalty points added to his licence. Haryanto retired from his debut race due to a drive link problem on the 18th lap. Amusingly, Haryanto was the most-voted driver in Formula One's newly-introduced Driver of the Day vote, before the award went to Romain Grosjean, who scored points for the debuting Haas team.

Haryanto was the second driver to be eliminated from qualifying for the 2016 Bahrain Grand Prix, ahead of Felipe Nasr. However, this meant a grid place of 20th due to Renault's Kevin Magnussen having to start from the pitlane after failing to stop for weighing during practice. He was the last car to finish the race, in 17th place and one lap down. He managed to beat the other Renault driver Jolyon Palmer to 21st in China, before he became tangled up in a first-lap crash in Russia that involved Nico Hülkenberg and Esteban Gutiérrez. Haryanto repeated his Bahrain performance in Spain, with his next race in Monaco bringing him a career-best 15th, albeit 4 laps down and once again the last classified finisher. He remained the last classified car in the next two races, with 19th and 18th places, before a 16th-place finish in Austria brought attention to the gap in talent between himself and teammate Wehrlein, who scored Manor's only point of the season in the same race. He spun off in the wet in Britain, whilst what would turn out to be his final two races again saw him the last classified finisher as his future became unclear due to a lack of sponsorship.

On 10 August 2016, Manor confirmed that they were demoting Haryanto to reserve driver due to a lack of sponsorship. This was because the promised funds from the Indonesian Ministry of Youth and Sport had been blocked by the Parliament, citing invalid procedures of funding procurements by Minister of Youth and Sport Imam Nahrawi. Esteban Ocon was announced as his replacement. When the parent company of the team collapsed at the end of the season, Haryanto was the only driver of the team not to make the 2017 grid, with Ocon and Wehrlein moving to Force India and Sauber respectively.

Sports car racing

2018 
Haryanto participated in the 2018 SIC888 Race at Shanghai International Circuit. He teamed up with fellow Indonesians, Anderson Tanoto and Audi R8 LMS Cup champion Andrew Haryanto (no relation), driving an Audi R8 LMS GT4. The trio finished the 6-hour race in 5th position.

2019 
Haryanto competed in the 2019 Blancpain GT World Challenge Asia with T2 Motorsports, driving the No. 75 Ferrari 488 GT3 alongside Indonesian compatriot David Tjiptobiantoro in all but the third round, where Tjiptobiantoro was replaced by Singaporean driver Gregory Teo. He finished 31st overall and 12th in the Pro-Am Cup.

Haryanto also raced in the 2019-20 Asian Le Mans Series, again with T2 Motorsports, driving the No. 75 Ferrari 488 GT3 with Tjiptobiantoro and Italian driver Christian Colombo. He finished 9th in the driver's championship.

Personal life
Haryanto was born in Solo to Sinyo Haryanto and Indah Pennywati, both Surakarta locals of Chinese-Indonesian descent. His three older brothers are Roy, Ricky and Rian. The three of them also had careers in national racing events with their father who was also active in racing until 2003.

In 2014, Haryanto earned a business degree from Anglia Ruskin University, studying at their Singaporean campus. At the beginning of 2017, he entered the business field as he was assigned by his father to oversee the security printing division at his family's printing company Kiky. During Haryanto's Formula One career, Kiky were involved in a lawsuit over copyright infringement with Spanish cartoonist Adaco as they were claimed to have used Adacos' works in their printing without permission. Haryanto is also known to own a restaurant in Colomadu, Karanganyar.

Haryanto and his family are devout Muslims. Whenever he races, he would adhere the Throne Verse on his car cockpit and read it as part of his race ritual.

Racing record

Karting career summary

Racing career summary 

† As Haryanto was a guest driver, he was ineligible for points.

Complete GP3 Series results
(key) (Races in bold indicate pole position) (Races in italics indicate fastest lap)

† Driver did not finish the race, but was classified as he completed over 90% of the race distance.

Complete Auto GP results
(key) (Races in bold indicate pole position) (Races in italics indicate fastest lap)

Complete GP2 Series results
(key) (Races in bold indicate pole position) (Races in italics indicate fastest lap)

† Driver did not finish the race, but was classified as he completed over 90% of the race distance.

Complete GP2 Final results
(key) (Races in bold indicate pole position) (Races in italics indicate fastest lap)

Complete Formula One results
(key) (Races in bold indicate pole position; races in italics indicate fastest lap)

Complete Blancpain GT World Challenge Asia results 
(key) (Races in bold indicate pole position) (Races in italics indicate fastest lap)

Asian Le Mans Series results
(key) (Races in bold indicate pole position) (Races in italics indicate fastest lap)

References

External links

 
 

1993 births
Living people
Asian Formula Renault Challenge drivers
Australian Formula 3 Championship drivers
Auto GP drivers
British Formula Three Championship drivers
Formula Renault Eurocup drivers
Formula BMW Europe drivers
Formula BMW Pacific drivers
GP2 Series drivers
GP3 Series drivers
Indonesian Formula One drivers
Indonesian racing drivers
Indonesian socialites
Indonesian Muslims
Indonesian people of Chinese descent
People from Surakarta
Manor Formula One drivers
Alumni of Anglia Ruskin University
Asia Racing Team drivers
Scuderia Coloni drivers
Team Meritus drivers
Manor Motorsport drivers
DAMS drivers
Carlin racing drivers
Campos Racing drivers
Caterham Racing drivers
AF Corse drivers